Kota Batu is a historical as well as populated area in Bandar Seri Begawan, the capital of Brunei. It is home to the Kota Batu archaeological site, a few of the country's museums and two mausoleums of the earliest Sultans of Brunei. However, the place is still populated and at present it is a neighbourhood of the capital.

Name 
"Kota Batu" is the Malay term which literally means "Stone Fort".

History 
Kota Batu was believed to be the ancient capital of Brunei, before the emergence of Kampong Ayer, which is further inland, and over the Brunei River, during the Brunei Civil War in the 17th century. According to Brunei source Silsilah Raja-Raja Brunei, Kota Batu was founded by Sharif Ali ibn Ajlan ibn Rumaithah ibn Muhammad. Among the founding workers were Chinese people. The palace, masjid and educational institutions were built in the quickly developing center of the Sultanate. During the reign of Muhammad Hassan, there were "two palaces within a square compound surrounded by a wall" in Kota Batu.

Administration 
As Kota Batu is still a populated area, it is primarily gazetted as a village, the third- and lowest-level administrative division of Brunei. It is one of the villages under the mukim of the same name, which a subdistrict of Brunei-Muara District. Kota Batu is also a designated postcode area with the postcode BD1517. However, the archaeological site in Kota Batu as well as its vicinity, which includes the mausoleums and the museums' area, have also been gazetted under the Antiquities and Treasure Trove Act of 1967 and thus managed by the government's Museums Department.

Since 2007, Kota Batu has also been incorporated into Bandar Seri Begawan municipal area and thus, becomes a neighbourhood of the capital.

Historical places 
Kota Batu is home to among the most important historical places in Brunei, which also serve as the country's tourist attractions.

Archaeological site 
The archaeological site in Kota Batu was discovered in the 1950s and it was the first one in the archaeological history of the country. Kota Batu archaeological site has since become the largest and most prominent, which has since yielded important artifacts, most notably Chinese porcelain which are datable to the Song dynasty (960–1279 AD). The site has also unearthed remains of stone structures from the place eventually obtained the name. The site has now been made into an 'archaeological park' where it is opened to the public.

Royal mausoleums 
Kota Batu is also home to two royal tombs which belong to the third and fifth Sultans of Brunei, Sharif Ali and Bolkiah. The official history dates the Sultans to had lived in the fifteenth and sixteenth centuries respectively. Mausoleums have been built in the modern time to house the tombs.

Museums 
In regards to the historical importance of Kota Batu, a few museums have been established in the area. The Brunei Museum is the national museum of Brunei and the current building was inaugurated in 1972, although it is temporarily closed since 2014 until further notice. The Malay Technology Museum was opened in 1984 and has galleries mainly dedicated to depicting the traditional lifestyle and technology which had been practiced by the Kampong Ayer residents throughout history. The most recent museum in Kota Batu is the Brunei Darussalam Maritime Museum; it was inaugurated in 2015 and mainly exhibits the artifacts from the Brunei Shipwreck which was discovered off the coast of Brunei in 1997.

References 

History of Brunei
Villages in Brunei-Muara District
Neighbourhoods in Bandar Seri Begawan